Leprous is a Norwegian progressive metal band from Notodden, formed in 2001. The group was founded by singer and keyboardist Einar Solberg and guitarist Tor Oddmund Suhrke.

After releasing several demos with relatively unstable lineups, the band released their first studio album, Tall Poppy Syndrome, in 2009. They subsequently gained prominence as the live backing band of Ihsahn (who is Solberg's brother-in-law), who, in turn, contributed on several Leprous records as guest singer or producer. Their acclaimed 2011 album Bilateral led to further attention. After two albums which followed the same musical direction, Coal (2013) and The Congregation (2015), Leprous took a more rock-oriented and less metal approach with Malina (2017), their first record not to feature harsh vocals. Leprous further experimented on 2019's Pitfalls, which saw the band mixing art rock, pop and progressive influences into their established sound. Leprous released their seventh studio album Aphelion on 27 August 2021. Their albums have received mostly positive reviews.

History
The band's roster solidified by the time they recorded their debut album, Tall Poppy Syndrome in August 2008. American label Sensory Records signed the band and released the album in May 2009. Alex Henderson of AllMusic praised the band's debut for moving past the "staunchly pre-90s mentality" of contemporary progressive metal by blending the influence of Pink Floyd and King Crimson with alternative metal bands such as Tool.

The album received positive reviews while the band gained attention as the live band for Emperor's frontman, Ihsahn, whose wife, Starofash, is the sister to Leprous vocalist/keyboardist Einar Solberg. In 2010, Leprous appeared at ProgPower USA and ProgPower Europe, and later supported Therion on their European tour. After that tour, the band announced that they had split with bassist Halvor Strand, who was replaced by Rein Blomquist.

At the end of February 2011 the band announced that they had signed with Inside Out, with worldwide distribution through Century Media. The band's debut for Inside Out Records, Bilateral, was released on 22 August 2011 in Europe and a day later in North America and featured artwork by American surrealist Jeff Jordan and Spanish designer Ritxi Ostariz. The album featured a guest vocal appearance by Ihsahn and trumpets by Vegard Sandbukt.

On 20 May 2013, Leprous released Coal.  Vocalist Einar Solberg described the album as "a more melancholic and darker album than the more playful Bilateral. By darker, I don't mean more aggressive, but more severe. There is still a big range in the dynamics, but no jumping between different moods within a song."

On 5 May 2014, the band announced the departure of drummer Tobias Ørnes Andersen. He was replaced by Baard Kolstad, who played with Leprous throughout their 2013 Coal tour. The statement also revealed that the band was working on material for their next album.

In early June 2014 Prog magazine Radio Show on Team Rock Radio in the United Kingdom published tour dates for an Inside Out records showcase featuring labelmates Haken, Maschine and Leprous for Autumn 2014 in the United Kingdom and Europe.

On 25 May 2015, the album The Congregation was released via Inside Out Music. A video for the track "The Price" was shot and then released on 8 April. On 30 April 2015, another track of the album, "Rewind", was released.

On 1 March 2017, Leprous announced through their official Facebook page that a new studio album would be released this year.  The album, Malina, was released on 25 August 2017.

The band released a new single, "Golden Prayers", on 1 June 2018.

On 25 January 2019, Leprous released a cover of "Angel" by Massive Attack, along with an accompanying music video. The band had already performed the cover live during shows in late 2018.

Leprous entered the studio to record their sixth album in early 2019. The album, titled Pitfalls, was officially announced on 26 August 2019, along with the designated release date of 25 October 2019, as well as the artwork and tracklist.

Leprous continued to regularly perform live throughout 2020 and 2021, with the events streamed online from their home town of Notodden. This included performances of each of their studio albums (except Tall Poppy Syndrome) in full, including multiple live debuts and many songs performed for the first time with the band's current lineup.

On 9 June 2021, Leprous announced their seventh studio album Aphelion, with a release date of 28 August 2021. The band announced that the first single from Aphelion will be released on 26 June 2021.

Musical style and influences 
Leprous' style is typically classified as progressive metal or progressive rock and singled out for its progressive elements, peculiar harmonies, accomplished vocals, and blending of different genres. Their sound has also been categorized as avant-garde metal and alternative metal. However, the band's members do not affiliate themselves with a specific genre.

While all the members contribute to Leprous' music, Tor Oddmund Suhrke (guitarist) has penned most of the lyrics, and Einar Solberg (singer and keyboardist) composes the backbone for most of their songs; both are the only constant members in the band's line-up. In his formative years, the frontman took singing and piano lessons and he used to notate Leprous songs but later stopped doing so after feeling that their compositions written intuitively were better. The band has emphasised their intention of taking different approaches on every album.

The use of eight-string guitar has been a consistent element of the band's style. Contrary to the prevalent uses in modern progressive metal and djent, Tor Oddmund Suhrke's playing style includes the use of complex chords in a variety of alternate guitar tunings (often necessitated by the fact the chord progressions are originally written by Einar Solberg on keyboard). As of Pitfalls, the use of eight-string guitars has decreased; instead, it is the first album to feature acoustic guitars, as well as band members rotating to perform additional keyboards and percussion live.

Solberg claims inspiration from Radiohead, Massive Attack, Arvo Pärt, Susanne Sundfør, Behemoth, and The Prodigy in addition to more analogous progressive bands such as Porcupine Tree and The Dillinger Escape Plan. For his part, Suhrke cited The Mars Volta's Omar Rodríguez-López, Opeth's Mikael Åkerfeldt, Porcupine Tree's Steven Wilson, and The Dillinger Escape Plan's Ben Weinman as his four biggest guitar influences.

Band members

Current 
 Einar Solberg – lead vocals, keyboards (2001–present)
 Tor Oddmund Suhrke – guitars, backing vocals (2001–present)
 Baard Kolstad – drums (2014–present)
 Simen Børven – bass, backing vocals (2015–present)
 Robin Ognedal – guitars, backing vocals (2017–present)

Touring 
 Raphael Weinroth-Browne – cello, keyboards, backing vocals (2017–present)
 Pedro Miguel Nuñez Diaz – trumpet (2021–present)

Former 
 Stian Lonar – bass (2001–2002)
 Esben Meyer Kristensen – guitar (2001–2003)
 Kenneth Solberg – guitar (2001–2003, 2003–2004)
 Truls Vennman – drums (2001–2005)
 Halvor Strand – bass (2002–2010)
 Øystein Landsverk – guitar, backing vocals (2004–2017) 
 Tor Stian Borhaug – drums (2005–2007)
 Tobias Ørnes Andersen – drums (2007–2014)
 Rein Blomquist – bass (2010–2013)
 Martin Skrebergene – bass (2013–2015)

Timeline

Discography

Studio albums 
 Tall Poppy Syndrome (2009)
 Bilateral (2011)
 Coal (2013)
 The Congregation (2015)
 Malina (2017)
 Pitfalls (2019)
 Aphelion (2021)

Live albums 
 Live at Rockefeller Music Hall (2016)

Demos 
 Silent Waters (2004)
 Aeolia (2006)

References

External links 
 Official website

Norwegian progressive metal musical groups
Norwegian avant-garde metal musical groups
Musical groups established in 2001
2001 establishments in Norway
Musical groups from Notodden
Inside Out Music artists
Century Media Records artists